Thomas P. Walsh (born October 19, 1939) is a former Democratic member of the Pennsylvania House of Representatives.
 He was born in Scranton, Pennsylvania.

References

Democratic Party members of the Pennsylvania House of Representatives
Living people
1939 births